Robertson Field  is a public use airport located one nautical mile (2 km) west-southwest of the central business district of Langdon, a city in Cavalier County, North Dakota, United States. It is owned by the Langdon Airport Authority. This airport is included in the National Plan of Integrated Airport Systems for 2011–2015, which categorized it as a general aviation facility.

Facilities and aircraft 
Robertson Field covers an area of 100 acres (40 ha) at an elevation of 1,608 feet (490 m) above mean sea level. It has two runways: 14/32 is 3,600 by 60 feet (1,097 x 18 m) with an asphalt surface and 8/26 is 2,010 by 100 feet (613 x 30 m) with a turf surface.

For the 12-month period ending September 22, 2009, the airport had 3,750 aircraft operations, an average of 10 per day: 93.3% general aviation, 5.3% air taxi, and 1.3% military. At that time there were 14 aircraft based at this airport, all single-engine.

References

External links 
 Robertson Field (D44) from the North Dakota Aeronautics Commission 
 Aerial image as of September 1997 from USGS The National Map
 
 

Airports in North Dakota
Buildings and structures in Cavalier County, North Dakota
Transportation in Cavalier County, North Dakota